Edin Ćurić (born 22 August 1962) is a Bosnian  professional football manager and former player who is the director of the youth academy of Bosnian Premier League club Željezničar.

Club career
Ćurić began his football career at hometown club Željezničar. He had played for the club's youth squads before finally making his senior debut in the 1980–81 season, under the guidance of manager Ivica Osim. Ćurić stayed at Željezničar for ten seasons, before leaving for Spanish club Las Palmas. In 1992, he moved to Portugal and spent three seasons playing for Portimonense.

International career
Ćurić played one match for the Yugoslav national team on 29 August 1987 against the Soviet Union, in which he came on as a late substitute for Dragan Stojković.

Managerial career
Ćurić worked as a manager at Willem II U19 and Baronie's second team in the Netherlands. He was appointed manager of Baronie's first team in July 2015, but was sacked only five months later in December.

On 4 July 2022, Ćurić's hometown club Željezničar announced he was named as the club's new director of its youth academy.

References

External links

1962 births
Living people
Footballers from Sarajevo
Association football midfielders
Yugoslav footballers
Yugoslavia international footballers
Bosnia and Herzegovina footballers
FK Željezničar Sarajevo players
UD Las Palmas players
Portimonense S.C. players
Yugoslav First League players
Segunda División players
Liga Portugal 2 players
Segunda Divisão players
Yugoslav expatriate footballers
Expatriate footballers in Spain
Yugoslav expatriate sportspeople in Spain
Bosnia and Herzegovina expatriate footballers
Expatriate footballers in Portugal
Bosnia and Herzegovina expatriate sportspeople in Portugal
Bosnia and Herzegovina football managers
Bosnia and Herzegovina expatriate football managers
Expatriate footballers in the Netherlands
Bosnia and Herzegovina expatriate sportspeople in the Netherlands